Benjamin James White (born 27 May 1998) is a professional rugby union player who plays scrum half for London Irish in Premiership Rugby. Between 2015 and 2021 he made 71 appearances for Leicester Tigers.

Born in England, he qualifies for  via his grandfather, and debuted in Scotland's 2022 Six Nations Championship win v England.

Career

2014–2021: Leicester Tigers
White  made his first senior Tigers appearance aged 17, against Argentina at Welford Road in Marcos Ayerza's testimonial fixture in the build up to the 2015 Rugby World Cup.

White then made his Premiership debut against Harlequins on 25 October 2015; at the age of 17 years and 151 days White became the youngest player to play for Leicester in the Premiership.

White, a member of the Tigers Academy, captained the Tigers U18 Academy League Team, the Premiership 7’s team and ultimately captained the Tigers 1st 15 in the Premiership, aged 21. On the 16 June 2021 Leicester Tigers announced his release.

White is also the youngest professional player in Doncaster Knights history having made his debut against London Welsh on 23 April 2016, whilst on loan from Leicester.

England Under 20s and England XV
White, who represented England at U17's, featured for England U18-s in all of their 2016 Six Nations matches in 2016. On 3 January 2018 White was named in England under-20s squad for the 2018 U-20s Six Nations Championship, and he captained England under-20s.

White started for England under-20s in the 2018 Rugby World Cup Final against France, having started the semi-final against South Africa and being involved in every Pool game.

After a breakthrough year for Leicester in 2018-19, White was named in a squad for an uncapped  match against the Barbarians.

2021: London Irish
White joined Premiership Rugby side London Irish ahead of the 2021–22 season.

2022: Scotland International Squad
White qualifies for Scotland through having a Scottish grandfather. In January 2022 White was named in the Scotland squad for the 2022 6 Nations Championship. White was named as a replacement for Scotland's opening game of the Six Nations against .

Due to his form with London Irish during the 2022/23 English Premiership, he was selected as starting scrum-half for the Scotland team which won a third consecutive Calcutta Cup and a second away win at Twickenham in the opening round of the 2023 Guiness Six Nations.

International tries 

 As of 5 February 2023

References

External links
 

1998 births
Living people
English rugby union players
English people of Scottish descent
Scotland international rugby union players
People educated at Leicester Grammar School
People educated at Denstone College
Leicester Tigers players
Doncaster Knights players
Rugby union players from Stoke-on-Trent
Rugby union scrum-halves